Kwon Museok (hangul:권무석, February 12, 1942) is a Korean intangible cultural asset. Kwon Museok is a recognized artisan of Gungdo. He inherited the family business, which is 12 generations old. In 1994, he received the 'Proud Seoul Civil Prize' (hangul: 자랑스런 서울시민상 경력각궁공방).

Work experience
2000, Professor at Yanbian University
Korean Traditional Culture School, Teacher - Gungdo
Korea Military Academy, Teacher
Korean Air Force Academy, Teacher
Korea National Police University, Teacher

References

 

South Korean businesspeople
Living people
1942 births